Pain Afrakoti (also Romanized as Pā’īn Afrākotī; also known as Afrā Kotī and Pā’īn Afrā Kotī) is a village in Bisheh Sar Rural District, in the Central District of Qaem Shahr County, Mazandaran Province, Iran. At the 2006 census, its population was 592, in 168 families.

References 

Populated places in Qaem Shahr County